Duane Tatro (May 18, 1927 – August 9, 2020) was an American composer. Born in Los Angeles, he served in the United States Navy during World War II and he graduated from the University of Southern California. He became a composer for many television series, including Dynasty, The Love Boat, Barnaby Jones, M*A*S*H, Mannix, and The F.B.I..

References

1927 births
2020 deaths
People from Van Nuys, Los Angeles
People from Bell Canyon, California
United States Navy personnel of World War II
Military personnel from California
University of Southern California alumni
American male composers
American television composers
20th-century American composers
21st-century American composers
20th-century American male musicians
21st-century American male musicians